Yamy is a rural locality (a khutor) in Kletskoye Rural Settlement, Sredneakhtubinsky District, Volgograd Oblast, Russia. The population was 400 as of 2010. There are 17 streets.

Geography 
Yamy is located 40 km southwest of Srednyaya Akhtuba (the district's administrative centre) by road. Peschanka is the nearest rural locality.

References 

Rural localities in Sredneakhtubinsky District